IRNSS-1E is the fifth out of seven in the Indian Regional Navigational Satellite System (IRNSS) series of satellites after IRNSS-1A, IRNSS-1B, IRNSS-1C and IRNSS-1D. It is one among the seven of the IRNSS constellation of satellites launched to provide navigational services to the region. The satellite was placed in geosynchronous orbit. IRNSS-1E has been successfully launched into orbit on 20 January 2016

Satellite 
IRNSS-1E will help augmenting the satellite based navigation system of India which is currently under development. The navigational system so developed will be regional, targeted towards South Asia. The satellite will provide navigation, tracking and mapping services.

The satellite will have two payloads: a navigation payload and CDMA ranging payload in addition with a laser retro-reflector. The payload generates navigation signals at L5 and S-band.  design of the payload makes the IRNSS system interoperable and compatible with Global Positioning System (GPS) and Galileo. The satellite is powered by two solar arrays, which generate power up to 1,660 watts, and has a designed life-time of twelve years.

Launcher 
Polar Satellite Launch Vehicle, in its 33rd flight (PSLV-C31), launched IRNSS-1E, the fifth satellite of the Indian Regional Navigation Satellite System (IRNSS). The launch took place from the Second Launch Pad (SLP) of Satish Dhawan Space Centre (SDSC) SHAR, Sriharikota.  As in the previous four launches of IRNSS satellites, PSLV-C31 will use ‘XL’ version of PSLV. This is the eleventh time ‘XL’ configuration is being flown, earlier ten being PSLV-C11/Chandrayaan-1, PSLV-C17/GSAT-12, PSLV-C19/RISAT-1, PSLV-C22/IRNSS-1A, PSLV-C25/Mars Orbiter Spacecraft, PSLV-C24/IRNSS-1B, PSLV-C26/IRNSS-1C, PSLV-C27/IRNSS-1D, PSLV-C28/DMC-3 and PSLV-C30/ASTROSAT missions.

See also 

 List of IRNSS satellites
 Communication-Centric Intelligence Satellite (CCI-Sat)
 GPS-aided geo-augmented navigation (GAGAN)
 Satellite navigation

References

External links 
 PSLV-C31/IRNSS-1E 
 ISRO Media Online Registration for Launch Coverage 
 ISRO Future Programmes
 IRNSS-1E Real Time Tracking

Spacecraft launched by India in 2016
IRNSS satellites
Spacecraft launched by PSLV rockets